Thomas  Knight, known as Tommy Knight, (born 1865) was an English footballer who played for Wolverhampton Wanderers.

One of the early stars of the Wolves side, Tommy Knight could play in any forward position, but preferred the inside–right berth. Strong and powerful, he loved to dribble, head down with the ball and occasionally upset his colleagues by doing this far too much! Born in Wolverhampton in 1865, Knight joined Wolves at the age of 20/21 in August 1886 from Pickwick. (NOTE: Matthews states Knight born in 1864 but Joyce and ENFA state 1865 therefore I have gone with the majority)

Tommy Knight, playing as a winger, made his League debut on 22 September 1888 at Dudley Road, the then home of Wolverhampton Wanderers. The visitors were Burnley who were defeated 4–1, Tommy Knight scoring the fifth and final goal of the match to put the home team 4–1 ahead. Tommy Knight appeared in 17 of the 22 League matches played by Wolverhampton Wanderers in season 1888–89 and scored seven League goals. Knight also played in all six of Wolverhampton Wanderers FA Cup ties scoring five goals in the early rounds. He appeared in the Final which was lost to Preston North End, 3–0. Playing as a winger (12 appearances) or wing–half (four appearances) Knight played in a Wolverhampton Wanderers midfield that achieved big (three–League–goals–or–more) wins on six separate occasions.

Knight stayed with the Wanderers until 1890, although his career came to an abrupt end on 28 September 1889 when he was injured playing at Stoke while occupying the right–back position (in an emergency). He made 33 appearances for Wolverhampton Wanderers (21 League) and scored 17 goals (eight League goals).

One source has Knight playing for Willenhall in 1890; Bilston in 1891 and Darlaston in 1892.

References

1865 births
English footballers
Wolverhampton Wanderers F.C. players
Willenhall F.C. players
Bilston F.C. players
Darlaston F.C. players
English Football League players
Year of death missing
Place of death missing
Footballers from Wolverhampton
Association football forwards
FA Cup Final players